
Gmina Mniów is a rural gmina - administrative district - in Kielce County, Świętokrzyskie Voivodeship, located in south-central Poland.

As of 2006 its total population is 9,249. It contains part of the protected area called Suchedniów-Oblęgorek Landscape Park.

Villages
Gmina Mniów contains the villages and settlements of Baran, Borki, Chyby, Cierchy, Gliniany Las, Grzymałków, Kontrewers, Lisie Jamy, Malmurzyn, Mniów, Mokry Bór, Olszyna, Pałęgi, Pępice, Piaski, Pielaki, Pieradła, Podchyby, Przełom, Rogowice, Serbinów, Skoki, Sośnina, Stachura, Straszów, Węgrzynów, Wólka Kłucka, Zaborowice and Zachybie.

Neighbouring gminas
Gmina Mniów is bordered by the gminas of Łopuszno, Miedziana Góra, Radoszyce, Smyków, Stąporków, Strawczyn and Zagnańsk.

References
Polish official population figures 2006

Mniow
Kielce County